"Let Go" is a song by the American rock band Cheap Trick, which was released in 1988 as the fourth single from their tenth studio album Lap of Luxury. It was written by guitarist Rick Nielsen and Todd Cerney, and produced by Richie Zito.

As a single, "Let Go" was released on 7" vinyl in Australia only. The B-side, "I Know What I Want", is a live recording, recorded during 1979 at Daytona Beach, Florida. In the US, the song reached No. 35 on the US Billboard Mainstream Rock Chart.

Critical reception
Upon release, Ira Robbins of Rolling Stone called the song "first-rate, a tough-talking put-down with a honking horn bridge and a guitar hook that is reminiscent of the Beatles' 'If I Needed Someone.'"  Robbins also wrote for Trouser Press that "Let Go" gets Lap of Luxury off to a "fine start." Music writers Mike Hayes and Ken Sharp compare the song's riff to another Beatles' song, saying that "Let Go"'s riff combines that of "Day Tripper" with the riff of Cheap Trick's own song "I Don't Love Here Anymore." Hayes and Sharp credit the song with "a catchy chorus, understated piano work and an unexpected sax break."

Track listing
7" single
"Let Go" - 4:27
"I Know What I Want (Live)" -

Chart performance

Personnel 
Cheap Trick
 Robin Zander - lead vocals, rhythm guitar
 Rick Nielsen - lead guitar, backing vocals
 Tom Petersson - bass, backing vocals
 Bun E. Carlos - drums, percussion

Additional personnel 
 Richie Zito - producer
 Phil Kaffel - engineer, mixer
 Jim Champagne, Bernard Frings, Mike Tacci, Bob Vogt, Toby Wright - second engineers

References

1988 singles
Cheap Trick songs
Song recordings produced by Richie Zito
Songs written by Rick Nielsen
Songs written by Todd Cerney
Epic Records singles
1988 songs